Manes is a band from Trondheim, Norway, formed in 1993. They started out as a two-piece band composed of Sargatanas and Cernunnus (or Cern). They have been signed to Candlelight Records, Hammerheart Records and the Italian experimental label Code666. The band's earlier works, up to and including Under Ein Blodraud Maane (1999), were somewhat atypical Norwegian black metal and were highly lauded by fans of the genre. However, as of Vilosophe (2003) and How the World Came to an End (2007) the band completely changed its sound to a hybrid of jazz, trip hop, electronica and metal with clean sung vocals and many progressive overtones. In spite of being highly acclaimed by critics this subsequent change of direction alienated most of their original fan base.

In 2011, the band released an official statement on their web site that they were calling it quits due to health and family reasons. They resurfaced 2 years later in 2013 and following year, 2014, released their fourth album, Be All End All, as well as an LP re-release of the debut Under Ein Blodraud Maane and compilation album of obscurities and rare material called Teeth, Toes and other trinkets. In 2018, Manes announced their comeback with a new album, Slow Motion Death Sequence.

History

Under Ein Blodraud Maane: 1992–1999
Manes was started by Cernunnus in 1992 as a side-project of Atrox, a band he was playing in back then. A few experimental lineups, Manes settled as a two-man band, with Sargatanas doing the vocal duties and Cernunnus doing the rest of the instruments. The first demo: Maanens Natt (1993), the second Ned i Stillheten (1994) and the third: Til Kongens Grav de Døde Vandrer (1995). The debut album Under Ein Blodraud Maane was released by the Dutch label Hammerheart Records. After that album, Cernunnus took a long break from music.

Vilosophe to How the World Came to an End: 2002–2011
Manes resurfaced in 2002, with new line-up, new musical style and new appearance. Their second album, Vilosophe, was released in 2003 by the Italian label Code666, sublabel of Aural Music, to an unprepared audience. This abrupt change and unexpected behaviour have followed the band in everything they have done since. Manes played some gigs and festivals like Inferno Metal Festival in 2004, Hole in the Sky, Southern Discomfort and Quart Festival, and shared a stage with bands like Isis, Katatonia, Red Harvest and Theatre of Tragedy among others to finalize their commitment to Aural Music. Manes released the [view] EP in 2006 as an intermezzo between albums. Rune Hoemsnes left the band briefly in 2006, but finished laying drumming parts for the band next album. Tor-Arne Helgesen was hired for the corresponding tour and subsequent recording sessions.  In 2007, Manes released the web ep Deprooted and the album How the World Came to an End via the British label Candlelight Records. This album further explored more the musical styles of Vilosophe and saw Manes as a more creative collective collaborating with a group of guests. During the recording sessions for this album, Manes were attempting to produce and record the following album Be All End All, but the album ended up being released only in 2014. The reviews for How the World Came to an End were good, and the band gained a lot of attention, but no concerts were played in the wake of the release. The band took a time off, and 15 different Manes web albums were released in 2011, among these Overheated, Deep North and Roman Shower.

Be All End All to Slow Motion Death Sequence: 2013–present
In spring 2013 the band resurfaced with new creative urge. The standstill was due to factors like health and family, and the associated Manes members were devoted to other bands and projects, many of whom were collaboration between two or more of band members. In the summer of 2013 Manes released a new track “Blanket of Ashes” online, and announced that the album Be All End All finally will be released following a compilation album of obscurities and rare material called Teeth, Toes and other trinkets, both via the French label Debemur Morti. Since November 2015, the band has been recording their fifth studio record according to their Facebook page. In early 2018, Manes announced a new album, Slow Motion Death Sequence.

Members

Current members
 Tor-Helge Skei - guitars, keyboards, programming (1993-1999, 2002-2011, 2013-present)
 Eivind Fjøseide - guitars (2002-2011, 2013-present)
 Torstein Parelius - bass (2002-2011, 2013-present)
 Rune Hoemsnes - drums, percussion (2002-2006, 2013-present)
 Asgeir Hatlen - vocals (2002-2007, 2016-2019, 2020-present)

Former members
 Sargatanas - vocals (1993-1999)
 Tommy Sebastian Halseth - vocals (2002-2003)
 Emil Sporsheim - vocals (2005-2006)
 Tor-Arne Helgesen - drums (2006-2011)

Live members
 Emil Sporsheim - lead vocals (2004-2007)
 Tommy Sebastian Halseth - backing vocals (2004-2007)
 Tom Engelsøy - vocals (2014-2016)
 Rune Folgerø - vocals (2015-2016)

Guest members/close collaborators
 Asgeir Hatlen - vocals (2014, 2020)
 Rune Folgerø - vocals (2014, 2018)
 Tom Engelsøy - vocals (2018, 2020)
 Ana Carolina Skaret - vocals (2018, 2020)
 Anna Murphy - vocals (2018, 2020)
 Tor Arne Helgesen - drums (2018)

Timeline

Discography

Studio albums
Under Ein Blodraud Maane (1999) - Hammerheart Records
Vilosophe (2003) - Code666 Records
How the World Came to an End (2007) - Candlelight Records
Be All End All (2014) - Debemur Morti Productions
Slow Motion Death Sequence (2018) - Debemur Morti Productions

Demos and EPs
Maanens Natt (1993)
Ned i Stillheten (1994)
Til Kongens Grav de Døde Vandrer (1995)
[view] (2006)
Reinvention - remixes (2008)
Pro-Gnosis-Diabolis 1993 / Solve Et Coagula - split with other Manes (2009)
Solve et Coagula (2009)
Vntrve (2014)

Singles
Deeprooted (2007)
Young Skeleton (2020)

Compilation albums
1993-1994 (2005)
Svarte Skoger (2006)
How The World... - Preprod #1 (2009)
New Stuff #1 (2010)
#418 :: The Plot Thickens (2011)
#417 :: Disorient (2011)
#416 :: The Map Is Not the Land (2011)
#415 :: Thin Air (2011)
#414 :: Nil (2011)
#413 :: Funeral Home (2011)
#412 :: Deep North (2011)
#411 :: Marbled Skin (2011)
#410 :: All You Can Eat (2011)
#409 :: Overheated (2011)
#408 :: Hardened (2011)
#407 :: Olympian (2011)
#406 :: The True Name of God (2011)
#405 :: Vardøger (2011)
#404 :: Roman Shower (2011)
#403 :: New Shit Has Come to Light (2011)
Be All End All v0.0.1 [Beta Beta] - reissue of New Stuff #1 (2011)
Teeth, Toes and other Trinkets (2014)

References

External links

 Manes at Last.fm

Norwegian black metal musical groups
Norwegian avant-garde metal musical groups
Musical groups established in 1993
1983 establishments in Norway
Musical groups disestablished in 2011
2011 disestablishments in Norway
Post-metal musical groups
Musical groups from Trondheim
Candlelight Records artists